The Bishop of Tuam, Killala and Achonry is the Church of Ireland Ordinary of the united Diocese of Tuam, Killala and Achonry in the Province of Armagh. The present incumbent is the Right Reverend Patrick Rooke.

The bishop has two episcopal seats (Cathedra): St. Mary's Cathedral, Tuam and St Patrick's Cathedral, Killala. There had been a third, St. Crumnathy’s Cathedral, Achonry, but it was deconsecrated in 1998 and is now used for ecumenical events.

Following the retirement in January 2011 of the Right Reverend Richard Henderson, it was proposed that no successor be elected immediately, so as to give a committee time to consider the future of the diocese; this proposal was, however, defeated on 5 March 2011 at a special meeting of the Church of Ireland General Synod called to consider the suggestion. A successor was accordingly elected.

List of bishops

See also

Archbishop of Tuam
Bishop of Killala and Achonry
Bishop of Killala
Bishop of Achonry

References

Tuam, Killala and Achonry
 Bishop
Tuam